Iban Mayo Diez (born 19 August 1977 in Igorre, Basque Country, Spain) is a former professional road bicycle racer.

Biography
He stayed with Euskaltel-Euskadi throughout 2000–2006. The biggest result came in the 2003 Tour de France, when he won a stage up Alpe d'Huez. Mayo finished the Tour sixth.

In 2004 Mayo won the Critérium du Dauphiné Libéré, regarded as preparation for the Tour de France. He beat Lance Armstrong by two minutes in a time trial on Mont Ventoux, breaking the record. He was seen as a dangerous outsider for the Tour de France in the same year. It turned out a disappointment, and after losing time due to a crash, he lost more in the Pyrenees due to injuries and mononucleosis. Mayo quit before the 15th stage.

After a lackluster 2005, in 2006 he returned in the Dauphiné Libéré with second place in Briançon and a win on the stage to La Toussuire. He was seen as a contender for the 2006 Tour de France, but retired during the 11th stage.

Mayo won the 19th stage of the 2007 Giro d'Italia. On 30 July 2007 the UCI confirmed he had failed a test for EPO during the Tour de France, in which he finished 16th. On 22 October the Spanish federation cleared Mayo after a second test proved negative. The UCI president Pat McQuaid stopped short of clearing the rider, pending further tests.

On 19 December a French laboratory confirmed the positive test. In 2008, the Court of Arbitration for Sport upheld Mayo's two-year ban, which ended on 31 July 2009.

On 13 September 2009, Mayo decided not to make a comeback to professional cycling, thus effectively ending his career.

Career achievements

Major results

1995 
 3rd Time trial, National Junior Road Championships
 4th Road race, UCI Junior Road World Championships
2001
 1st  Overall Grand Prix du Midi Libre
 1st Classique des Alpes
 1st Stage 6 Critérium du Dauphiné Libéré
 3rd Overall Grande Prémio Jornal de Notícias
2002
 5th Overall Vuelta a España
2003
 1st  Overall Tour of the Basque Country
1st Stages 1, 5a & 5b (ITT)
 2nd Overall Critérium du Dauphiné Libéré
1st  Points classification
1st  Mountains classification
1st  Combination classification
1st Prologue & Stage 4
 2nd Liège–Bastogne–Liège
 5th Overall Setmana Catalana de Ciclisme
 6th Overall Tour de France
1st Stage 8
 10th Karlsruher Versicherungs Grand Prix (with Haimar Zubeldia)
2004
 1st  Overall Critérium du Dauphiné Libéré
1st Prologue & Stage 4 (ITT)
 1st  Overall Vuelta Asturias
1st  Points classification
 1st  Overall Clásica de Alcobendas
1st  Points classification
1st Stages 1 & 2
 1st Subida al Naranco
 2nd Overall Tour of the Basque Country
 2nd Classique des Alpes
2006
 1st  Overall Vuelta a Burgos
1st Stage 4
 1st Subida a Urkiola
 1st Stage 6 Critérium du Dauphiné Libéré
2007
 1st Stage 19 Giro d'Italia

Grand Tour general classification results timeline

See also
 List of doping cases in cycling

Notes and references

External links
 
 

1977 births
Living people
Cyclists from the Basque Country (autonomous community)
Spanish Giro d'Italia stage winners
Spanish male cyclists
Spanish Tour de France stage winners
Doping cases in cycling
Spanish sportspeople in doping cases
People from Arratia-Nerbioi
Sportspeople from Biscay